Zombie Island Massacre is a 1984 horror film directed by film editor John N. Carter (in his sole directing effort) and starred David Broadnax and Rita Jenrette. The film is currently distributed by Troma Entertainment.

Plot 
A group of American tourists on vacation in the Caribbean watch a voodoo ceremony.  As they take a tour of a local island at night, they become stranded when their bus driver disappears. The group of tourists take refuge in an old mansion, one by one falling victim to an unknown menace.

Cast 
 David Broadnax as Paul
 Rita Jenrette as Sandy
 Tom Cantrell as Steve
 Diane Clayre Holub as Connie
 Ian McMillian as Joe
 George Peters as Whitney
 Dennis Stephenson as Tour Guide
 Trevor Reid as Voodoo Priest
 Christopher Ferris as Matt

Release 
Troma released Zombie Island Massacre on a triple pack in January 2004 and a 15 pack in October 2006.  In August 2014, it played at the eighth B Movie Celebration, hosted by Joe Bob Briggs.

Reception 
Ian Jane of DVD Talk said that the film has "a sense of ridiculous charm to it" and is enjoyable despite its flaws.  Writing in the Zombie Movie Encyclopedia, academic Peter Dendle said, "Though up-scale for a Troma release, this is still unbearably tedious and awful, to be avoided by any expedient."  Dendle writes that although the film does not have traditional Romero-style zombies, the voodoo ceremony raises what seems to be Haitian zombie.

References

External links 

 
 

1984 films
1984 horror films
American independent films
1980s English-language films
American zombie films
Films set in the Caribbean
Films set on islands
Films set in country houses
Troma Entertainment films
Films scored by Harry Manfredini
Films about Voodoo
1980s American films
1984 directorial debut films